is a retired Japanese bantamweight weightlifter. He competed at the 1964 and 1968 Olympics and finished in third and fifth place, respectively. Between 1963 and 1965 he set three official world records – two in the snatch and one in the total.

References

1944 births
Living people
Japanese male weightlifters
Olympic weightlifters of Japan
Weightlifters at the 1964 Summer Olympics
Weightlifters at the 1968 Summer Olympics
Olympic bronze medalists for Japan
Olympic medalists in weightlifting
Medalists at the 1964 Summer Olympics
20th-century Japanese people
21st-century Japanese people